The Oman Davis Cup team represents Oman in the Davis Cup tennis competition and is governed by the Oman Tennis Association. It competed in its first Davis Cup in 1994.

Oman currently competes in the Asia/Oceania Zone of Group IV.

Last team (2021)

 Ali Al Busaidi
 Isa Ali Al Suleimani
 Marwan Alkhanjari

See also
Davis Cup

External links

Davis Cup teams
Davis Cup
Davis Cup